"Talking Body" is a song by Swedish singer and songwriter Tove Lo, released to American contemporary hit radio on 13 January 2015 by Republic Records. It served as the second single from her debut studio album, Queen of the Clouds (2014). It reached the top 20 in Flanders, Canada, Finland, Sweden, The United Kingdom, and The United States.

Composition
"Talking Body" was written by Lo, Jakob Jerlström and Ludvig Söderberg, while its production was handled by The Struts and Shellback. It is an electropop song, with elements of trip hop, synthpop and indie pop. Lyrically, the song is about trying to seduce someone into having sexual relations. The song plays in the key of E minor, at a tempo of 120 beats per minute. It has a chord sequence of Em-D-G-C-D.

Critical reception
The song was praised for its impudence. Sam Lansky of Time wrote "Lo can be vulgar, as on the lusty 'Talking Body', which sets a scabrous singalong hook against some of Shellback's irresistibly catchy production, but that sexiness is shot through with frustration; she owns her desire, full-throttle."

Music video and live performances 
The music video was premiered on 12 January 2015.

Since 2015, many of her live performances of the song for a live audience involved "stripping her clothes or flashing the crowd".

Chart performance
The song peaked at number 12 on the Billboard Hot 100, becoming her second top 20 entry after "Habits (Stay High)". Additionally, it peaked at number four on the Mainstream Top 40 charts, which lists the most played songs on pop radio stations. To date, the single has spent 30 weeks on the Hot 100, and has sold two million downloads. It has also peaked at number 14 in Canada.
As for Europe, it has peaked at number 16 in Sweden, number 100 in Germany, number 17 on the UK Singles Chart and number eight in Scotland, becoming her third top 20 entry after "Habits (Stay High)" and "Heroes (We Could Be)" with Alesso.

Track listing
Digital EP – The Remixes
 "Talking Body" (Gryffin Remix) – 4:29
 "Talking Body" (KREAM Remix) – 3:39
 "Talking Body" (WDL Remix) – 3:41
 "Talking Body" (Panic City Remix) – 4:46
 "Talking Body" (The Young Professionals Remix) – 3:39

Credits and personnel
Tove Lo – vocals, background vocals, songwriting
Ludvig Söderberg – writing
Jakob Jerlström – writing
The Struts, Shellback – producer

Charts

Weekly charts

Year-end charts

Certifications

Release history

See also
 List of number-one dance singles of 2015 (U.S.)

References

External links
 Official website
 
 
 

2014 songs
2015 singles
Island Records singles
Polydor Records singles
Republic Records singles
Song recordings produced by Shellback (record producer)
Songs written by Ludvig Söderberg
Songs written by Tove Lo
Tove Lo songs
Songs written by Jakob Jerlström
Electropop songs
Dance-pop songs